Channel, channels, channeling, etc., may refer to:

Geography
 Channel (geography), in physical geography, a landform consisting of the outline (banks) of the path of a narrow body of water.

Australia
 Channel Country, region of outback Australia in Queensland and partly in South Australia, Northern Territory and New South Wales.
 Channel Highway, a regional highway in Tasmania, Australia.

Europe
 Channel Islands, an archipelago in the English Channel, off the French coast of Normandy
 Channel Tunnel or Chunnel, a rail tunnel underneath the English Channel
 English Channel, called simply "The Channel", the part of the Atlantic Ocean that separates Great Britain from northern France

North America
 Channel Islands of California, a chain of eight islands located in the Pacific Ocean off the coast of Southern California, United States
 Channel Lake, Illinois, a census-designated place in Lake County, Illinois, United States
 Channels State Forest,  a state forest in Virginia, United States
 Channel, Channel-Port aux Basques, Newfoundland, Newfoundland and Labrador, Canada; a town district

Other places
 Channel Glacier, a glacier in the Palmer Archipelago, Antarctica
 Channel Rock (disambiguation), various rocks

Arts, entertainment, and media

Television
 Channel Television, a division of British ITV
 Channels TV (Niger) A company of Tele Sahel.

Other uses in arts, entertainment, and media
 Channeler (The Wheel of Time), fictional characters in the Wheel of Time fantasy book series by Robert Jordan
 Channeling (Rolemaster), a magic element in the Rolemaster role-playing game
 Channels (band), fronted by former Jawbox singer/guitarist J. Robbins
 Channels (film), a 2008 film
 Pre-chorus, or build or channel, part of a song structure of popular music

Science and technology

Communications
 Communication channel, a transmission medium used to convey information
 Audio channel, a communications channel in a storage device used in operations such as multitrack recording and playback
 Channel (broadcasting), a range of frequencies assigned for the operation of a television, radio, or other broadcast station
 Television channel, a television station or its cable/satellite counterpart
 Channel (digital image), the grayscale representation of a primary color in a digital image
 Channel (programming), in computer science, a tool used for interprocess communication
 Channel I/O, in computing, a high-performance input/output (I/O) architecture
 Video blog,  hosted by a video-sharing website or channel

Other uses in science and technology
 Channel (semiconductor), a part of the structure of a field-effect transistor
 Ion channel, a protein that allows ion flow through a cell membrane
 Scattering channel, a concept in quantum mechanics
 Strut channel, a standardized formed structural system used in the construction and electrical industries
 Structural channel

Brands and enterprises
 The Channel (nightclub), a music venue in Boston, Massachusetts, U.S.
 Channel Express, a defunct British airline
 Channel Home Centers, a defunct home improvement chain based in the northeastern United States

Business and legal terms
 Channel (chart pattern), a pair of parallel trend lines that form a chart pattern for a stock or commodity
 Distribution channel, a chain of intermediaries, each passing the product down the chain to the next organization, before it finally reaches the consumer
 Legal channeling, the act of legally making one entity responsible for an event, and thereby dismissing other parties from liability
 Marketing channel, set of activities necessary to transfer the ownership of goods from the point of production to the point of consumption

Sports
 Channel (association football), football (soccer) terminology for particular areas of the pitch
 Channel (horse), a racehorse
 Channel Football Club, an Australian football club in Tasmania

Other uses
 Channel catfish, a catfish species in North America
 Meridian (Chinese medicine), or channels, a concept central to traditional Chinese medical techniques such as acupuncture, and to martial arts such as tai chi and qigong
 Mediumship or channelling, communication with spirits

See also

 Canal (disambiguation)
 Chanel (disambiguation)
 Channeling (disambiguation)